Kibaha is one of nine administrative districts of Pwani Region in Tanzania. The name means '"it is here" in Zaramo. Kibaha District is bordered to the northeast by Kibaha Urban District and the north by Chalinze District. The district is bordered to the southeast by the Kisarawe District, On the western side the district is borderd by Morogoro District of Morogoro Region. The district seat (capital) is the town and ward of Mlandizi. 
According to the 2012 census, the district has a total population of 70,209.

Administrative subdivisions
As of 2016, Kibaha District was administratively divided into 11 wards.

Wards 

 Bokomnemela
 Dutumi
 Gwata
 Janga
 Kikongo
 Kilangalanga
 Kwala
 Magindu
 Mlandizi
 Ruvu
 Soga

Education & Health 
As of 2022, there were  8 are secondary schools. 
In Terms of Healthcare facilities, as of 2022, Kibaha district is home to 3 health centers and  24 dispensaries.

References

Districts of Pwani Region